Nothris verbascella, the clay groundling, is a moth of the family Gelechiidae. It was described by Michael Denis and Ignaz Schiffermüller in 1775. It is found in almost all of Europe, Transcaucasia, Asia Minor, the Near East and the Russian Far East.

The wingspan is 17–21 mm. There are two generations per year with adults on wing from May to early October.

References

 "Nothris lemniscellus (Zeller, 1839)". Insecta.pro. Retrieved December 11, 2017.

Moths described in 1775
Chelariini
Moths of Europe
Moths of Asia